Moyes is a surname. It may refer to:

 Chris Moyes (1949–2006), CEO of British Go-Ahead transport group
 Dave Moyes (born 1955), Scottish former footballer
 David Moyes (born 1963), Scottish football manager and former player
 Rev Gordon Moyes (1938–2015), Australian Christian evangelist and New South Wales MLC for Family First party
Helen Fraser (feminist), later Moyes (1881–1979), Scottish suffragist, feminist, educationalist, politician emigrated to Australia, toured America to develop WWI Women's Land Army
 Henry Moyes (c. 1750–1807), blind Scottish lecturer on science subjects
 James Moyes (1851–1921), Scottish writer, theologian
 John Moyes (disambiguation) several people including:
 John Moyes (cricketer) (born 1946), English cricketer
 John Stoward Moyes (1884–1972), Australian Anglican bishop
 Johnny Moyes, born Alban George Moyes (1893–1963), Australian cricketer and commentator, brother of Morton Moyes
 Jojo Moyes (born 1969), English journalist and romance novelist
 Kim Moyes, Australian DJ and musician with "The Presets" electronica duo
 Kris Moyes, Australian director and producer of music videos
 Morton Henry Moyes (1886–1981), Australian Antarctic explorer and naval officer
 Patricia Moyes (1923–2000), British mystery writer

See also
 Moyse, a list of people with the surname or given name
 Moye (name), a list of people with the surname or given name